The 2022–23 European Rugby Champions Cup pool stage was the first stage of the 28th season of pan-European professional club rugby union competition, and the ninth under the European Rugby Champions Cup format. Twenty-four clubs from three major domestic and regional leagues competed over four rounds of pool fixtures, with 16 teams progressing to the knockout stages. For the first time, teams from South Africa were involved, after qualifying from the inaugural United Rugby Championship season.

Pool stage 
The pool stage draw took place on 21 July 2022. The complete fixture list was announced on 7 October 2022.

Teams in the same pool played two other teams twice, at home and away, in the group stage. The top eight teams in each pool progressed to the round of 16, whilst the teams ranked 9th and 10th progressed to the knockout stages of the 2022–23 European Rugby Challenge Cup.

Teams were awarded group points based on match performances; four points for a win, two points for a draw, one attacking bonus point for scoring four or more tries in a match and one defensive bonus point for losing a match by seven points or fewer.

In the event of a tie between two or more teams, the following tie-breakers were used, as directed by EPCR:

 Where teams have played each other
 The club with the greater number of competition points from only matches involving tied teams.
 If equal, the club with the best aggregate points difference from those matches.
 If equal, the club that scored the most tries in those matches.
 Where teams remain tied and/or have not played each other in the competition (i.e. are from different pools)
 The club with the best aggregate points difference from the pool stage.
 If equal, the club that scored the most tries in the pool stage.
 If equal, the club with the fewest players suspended in the pool stage.
 If equal, the drawing of lots will determine a club's ranking.

Pool A

Round 1

Round 2

Round 3

Round 4

Pool B

Round 1

Round 2

Round 3

Round 4

Notes

References 

Pool
European Rugby Champions Cup pool stages